Vincent Cobée (born 1968/1969) is a French businessman, and the chief executive officer (CEO) of French carmaker Citroën since January 2020.

Cobée earned degrees from the École Polytechnique, Ecole Nationale des Ponts et Chaussées and Harvard Business School.

In January 2020, Cobée who had formerly worked for Nissan and Mitsubishi and was deputy CEO Citroën, succeeded Linda Jackson as CEO.

References

Living people
Citroën
1960s births
École Polytechnique alumni
Harvard Business School alumni
French chief executives